Islands in the Sky: Bold New Ideas for Colonizing Space (Stanley Schmidt and Robert Zubrin, eds., Wiley, 1996) is a book composed of a collection of factual articles on space colonization, several from recognized experts in the field.

The articles range from colloquial to fairly technical, occasionally deriving results after a series of calculus equations. Their subject matter ranges from colonization of the inner Solar System to the outer Solar System and interstellar colonization, and from novel application of well-understood engineering principles, to speculative physics theories. It includes five articles authored or co-authored by Zubrin; other notable authors include Robert L. Forward, Martyn J. Fogg, and Christopher McKay. The book is also notable for including a publication of Robert Zubrin's Mars Direct mission architecture (first formulated in 1990), which was soon expanded into a book of its own, The Case For Mars: The Plan to Settle the Red Planet and Why We Must, and which provided the impetus for the founding of the Mars Society.

Contents
Introduction, Stanley Schmidt
Part One: Breaking the Bonds of the Earth
"Comes the Revolution...", G. Harry Stine
"The Hypersonic Skyhook", Robert Zubrin 
Part Two: Stepping Into the Solar System
"Mars Direct: A Proposal for the Rapid Exploration and Colonization of the Red Planet", Robert Zubrin and David A. Baker
"Inward Ho!", Stephen L. Gillett
"Colonizing the Outer Solar System", Robert Zubrin
"Islands in the Sky: Human Exploration and Settlement of the Oort Cloud", Richard P. Terra
"Alien Life Between Here and the Stars", Robert L. Forward
Part Three: Creating New Worlds
"Terraforming Mars", Robert Zubrin and Christopher P. McKay
"A Planet Dweller's Dreams", Martyn J. Fogg
"Astrophysical Engineering and the Fate of the Earth", Martyn J. Fogg
Part Four: Advanced Drives and Interstellar Travel
"To the Stars!", Gordon R. Woodcock
"The Magnetic Sail", Robert Zubrin
"The Tachyon Drive: Infinite Exhaust Velocity at Zero Energy Cost", John G. Cramer
"The Negative Matter Space Drive", Robert L. Forward
"The Economics of Interstellar Commerce", Warren Salomon

References

 

Islands in the Sky
Books by Robert Zubrin